Oliver 'Ollie' Hoare (born 29 January 1997) is an Australian middle-distance runner competing primarily in the 1500 metres. He achieved the biggest success of his career to date by winning the 1500 m at the 2022 Commonwealth Games in a Games record of 3:30.12.

Early years
Hoare's father Greg was a good track runner and a dual world beach running champion over 2 km. This rubbed off on him and he won the U15 (2012) and U17 (2013) 2 km beach run at the Australian titles along with team medals in the swim and board races.

Hoare swam at State level but then decided to concentrate on athletics. In 2015, he won the Australian Under-20 cross-country championship. He then left his local school and studied at the Combined Associated School Trinity Grammar. There was a strong sports system and Hoare was coached by Brad Woods. He became good friends with Morgan McDonald from the neighbouring Newington College who had a strong influence on his athletics career. McDonald was a four-time NCAA champion competing for the University of Wisconsin and Hoare followed him there.

Career
Hoare competed collegiately for the University of Wisconsin, where he won the 1500 metres at the 2018 NCAA Division I Outdoor Track and Field Championships. He also set the University of Wisconsin and Big Ten Conference records in indoor mile. After graduating, he signed to run professionally under the newly formed On Athletics Club, which is sponsored by the running shoe company On.

On 13 February 2021 at the New Balance Indoor Grand Prix, Hoare set the Australian and Oceanian record for the indoor 1500 m with a time of 3:32.35, which was also the seventh fastest all-time indoor mark.

In the 1500 m at the 2020 Olympic Games, staged in Tokyo in July-August 2021 because of the Covid-19 pandemic, Hoare finished third in a heat (in 3:36.09), fourth in a semi-final (in 3:34.35) and 11th in the final (in 3:35.79), which was won by Jakob Ingebrigtsen from Norway.

On 4 December 2021 at the BU Sharon Colyear-Danville Season Opener in Boston, Hoare broke the Australian and Oceanian indoor 5000 metres record by over 27 seconds with a time of 13:09.96. Fellow On Athletics Club runner Geordie Beamish finished second in that race with a time of 13:12.53 to set the New Zealand indoor record.

On his birthday, 29 January 2022, Hoare ran the men's Wanamaker Mile at the 114th Millrose Games in New York with a time of 3:50.83. The time took the Australian and Oceanian indoor mile record off Charlie Hunter, and placed Hoare as the 11th fastest indoor miler ever. He also became the first Australian to win the Wanamaker Mile in the race's 96-year history.

On 16 June 2022 at the Bislett Games, Hoare set the Australian and Oceanian outdoor mile record with a time of 3:47.48, finishing just behind Jakob Ingebrigtsen.

On 6 August 2022 at the 2022 Commonwealth Games held in Birmingham, he won the 1500 m men's final, setting a personal best and a new Games record of 3:30.12, beating Olympic silver medallist and 2019 world champion Timothy Cheruiyot (3:30.21) and 2022 world champion Jake Wightman (3:30.53). Hoare became the first Australian to take the Commonwealths 1500 m or mile title since Herb Elliott in 1958.

Competition record

International competitions

National and NCAA titles
 Australian Athletics Championships
 1500 metres: 2022
 NCAA Division I Men's Outdoor Track and Field Championships
 1500 metres: 2018

References

External links

 

1997 births
Living people
Athletes from Sydney
Australian male middle-distance runners
Wisconsin Badgers men's cross country runners
Athletes (track and field) at the 2020 Summer Olympics
Athletes (track and field) at the 2022 Commonwealth Games
Commonwealth Games gold medallists for Australia
Commonwealth Games medallists in athletics
Olympic athletes of Australia
20th-century Australian people
21st-century Australian people
Medallists at the 2022 Commonwealth Games